Adriana Ambesi was an Italian film actress of the 1960s. She is sometimes credited as Audrey Amber.

Selected filmography
 Samson and the Sea Beast (1963)
 Terror in the Crypt (1964)
 Mission to Hell (1964)
 Guns of Nevada (1965)
 Love Italian Style (1965)
 Hercules the Avenger (1965)
 Ten Thousand Dollars for a Massacre (1966)
 Seven Vengeful Women (1966)
 Malenka (1969)

References

Bibliography
 Thomas Weisser. Spaghetti Westerns: the Good, the Bad and the Violent. McFarland, 2005.

External links

Living people
Italian film actresses
20th-century Italian actresses
1944 births